Serhiy Litovchenko (born 4 October 1987) is a Ukrainian football goalkeeper who plays for FC Akzhayik.

Career
Litovchenko's first professional club was FC Arsenal Kharkiv. Next he played in the Ukrainian First League and then signed a contract with FC Volyn Lutsk in the Ukrainian Premier League. He made his Premier League debut entering as a second-half substitute against FC Shakhtar Donetsk on 6 August 2012.

Honours
Dinamo Tbilisi
 Erovnuli Liga: 2019

References

External links
 
 

Living people
1987 births
Ukrainian footballers
Association football goalkeepers
Ukrainian Premier League players
FC Arsenal Kharkiv players
FC Hazovyk-KhGV Kharkiv players
FC Feniks-Illichovets Kalinine players
FC Volyn Lutsk players
FC Naftovyk-Ukrnafta Okhtyrka players
FC Helios Kharkiv players
FC Olimpik Donetsk players
Footballers from Kharkiv
FC Zugdidi players
FC Dinamo Tbilisi players
Ukrainian expatriate footballers
Expatriate footballers in Georgia (country)
Ukrainian expatriate sportspeople in Georgia (country)
Kapaz PFK players
Expatriate footballers in Azerbaijan
Ukrainian expatriate sportspeople in Azerbaijan
FC Chornomorets Odesa players
FC Lviv players
FC Akzhayik players
FC Maktaaral players
Expatriate footballers in Kazakhstan
Ukrainian expatriate sportspeople in Kazakhstan